Siskin Children's Institute, (a non-profit organization with onsite locations in both Chattanooga, Tennessee and Nashville, Tennessee and remote services in the North Georgia area) is a charity for children with special needs and their families. The institute was founded in 1950 by Mose and Garrison Siskin, two Chattanooga businessmen.

The headquarters of the institute is located in downtown Chattanooga with a library, community education sessions, professional development seminars and family support programs. The Institute runs the Siskin Children's Institute-T.C. Thompson Children's Hospital Center for Developmental Behavioral Pediatrics which offers assessment, diagnosis and treatment to children with or at risk for developmental delays and disorders. The Institute employs three doctoral-level researchers who study developmental disabilities.

Siskin Children's Institute operates an inclusive childcare centers for children ages six weeks to five years old in Chattanooga. In 2020, Siskin Children's Institute opened a pediatric clinic in Nashville. In addition, Siskin Children's Institute provides developmental pediatrics, therapy, and home and community-based services for children with special needs and is affiliated with the Department of Pediatrics with The University of Tennessee College of Medicine Chattanooga and with Children's Hospital at Erlanger.

History 
In 1942, Garrison Siskin suffered a life-threatening injury, and surgeons told him that his leg would have to be amputated. He prayed to God that if his leg were spared, he would dedicate the rest of his life to helping others. The next morning, doctors told Garrison he would not lose his leg.

Garrison's brother Mose soon learned of the vow, he told his brother, "If it's your promise, it's my promise, and we will keep it together." They established the Siskin Foundation in 1950; and nine years later, they opened a rehabilitation center to provide outpatient services, including physical therapy, speech and language therapy, and even free dental care in Chattanooga.

During the next 30 years, the brothers championed numerous community projects focused on services for adults and children with disabilities. A highlight was the1959 opening of an outpatient rehabilitation center that included a preschool for young children with physical and developmental disabilities. The Siskin School was a precursor to today's multi-faceted Siskin Children's Institute, which serves children, families and professionals through four areas of focus: education, outreach, health care, and research.

Fundraising 
As the organization is a nonprofit, Siskin Children's Institute holds regular fundraising events, including StarNight, an annual event that typically features a major musical act. Past performers include Sugarland, LeAnn Rimes, Hootie and the Blowfish, and Colbie Caillat. Other fundraising events of the Institute include an annual fashion show known as Styleworks and the Think Different Business Breakfast.

References

External links
 Siskin Children's Institute website
 http://www.timesfreepress.com/news/2011/jan/04/siskin-escalates-autism-treatment/
 http://www.recmanagement.com/200209fp03.php

Organizations based in Chattanooga, Tennessee
Children's charities based in the United States
Charities based in Tennessee
Special education
Health charities in the United States
Medical and health organizations based in Tennessee